Ikizu (Ikikizu, Kiikiizo) is a Bantu language spoken by the Ikizu peoples of Tanzania. Dialects are Ikizu proper and Sizaki. Maho (2009) treats Sizaki (Shashi) as a separate language. However, Ethnologue 16th edition retired the ISO code for Sizaki, merging it into Ikizu.

Orthography 
Ikizu uses the Latin alphabet. It does not include the letters Q, V, or X. The letters B and C are only used in the forms Bh and Ch.

References

Sources
 Sewangi, Seleman S. (2008). Kiikiizo: Msamiati wa Kiikiizo–Kiingereza–Kiswahili na Kiingereza–Kiikiizo–Kiswahili / Ikiizo–English–Swahili and English–Ikiizo–Swahili Lexicon. .

Languages of Tanzania
Great Lakes Bantu languages